Hoggart is a surname. Notable people with the surname include:

Dennis Hoggart (born 1939), Scottish footballer
Kyllé Hoggart (stylised as Kylle Hogart), Dennis' daughter, Australian actress
Kellie Crawford (née Hoggart) (born 1974), Dennis' daughter, Australian singer and actress, Teen Queens and Hi-5
Paul Hoggart, British journalist and writer
Herbert Richard Hoggart (1918-2014), British academic and writer
Simon Hoggart (1946–2014), Herbert's son, English journalist and broadcaster
Amy Hoggart, (born 1986), Simon's daughter, British-American stand-up comedian and actress
Paul Hoggart, Herbert's son, British journalist and novelist